Events in the year 2023 in Finland.

Incumbents 

 President: Sauli Niinistö
 Prime Minister: Sanna Marin
 Parliament: 2019-2023 Eduskunta/Riksdag
 Speaker of the Parliament: Matti Vanhanen

Events 

 1 March – The Finnish Parliament votes 184–7 to formally approve the country's accession to NATO, and to adopt the military alliance's founding documents.

Scheduled 

 2 April or earlier – Next Finnish parliamentary election.

Sports 

 UEFA Euro 2024 qualifying Group H
 2022–23 Liiga season

References 

 
2020s in Finland
Years of the 21st century in Finland
Finland
Finland